Gadelbayevo (Ğäźelbay) is a rural locality (a village) in Itkulovsky 1st Selsoviet, Baymaksky District, Bashkortostan, Russia. The population was 309 as of 2010. There are 5 streets.

Geography 
Gadelbayevo is located 31 km west of Baymak (the district's administrative centre) by road. 1-ye Itkulovo is the nearest rural locality.

References 

Rural localities in Baymaksky District